Kadamtala is a village in the southwest part of Middle Andaman Island, Andaman Archipelago.  Its postal (PIN) code is 744209.

Administratively, it  belongs to the Rangat tehsil (county), North and Middle Andaman district, Andaman and Nicobar Islands territory of India.

Kadamtala is located about 24 km southwest of Rangat and 77 km north of Port Blair (straight line). It lies on the Great Andaman Trunk Road and has access to the sea through a winding tidal channel that opens into Homfrey's Strait.

See also
 Kadamtala, a village in West Bengal, India.

References

Villages in North and Middle Andaman district